Monika Schwingshackl (born 5 March 1972) is an Italian biathlete. She competed in three events at the 1992 Winter Olympics.

References

External links
 

1972 births
Living people
Biathletes at the 1992 Winter Olympics
Italian female biathletes
Olympic biathletes of Italy
Place of birth missing (living people)
People from Toblach
Sportspeople from Südtirol